The Indian Nation Turnpike, also designated State Highway 375 (SH-375), is a toll road in southeastern Oklahoma, United States, running between Hugo and Henryetta, Oklahoma, a distance of . It is the longest tollway in the state.

Route description
The Indian Nation Turnpike is built to parkway-like design standards, omitting a center barrier and left-hand shoulders for a slightly mounded grassy median that is flush with the edge of the left lane in each direction. However, the median is slowly being upgraded to a cable barrier with left shoulders bordering it.

Law enforcement along the Indian Nation Turnpike is provided by Oklahoma Highway Patrol Troop XC, a special troop assigned to the turnpike.

The only service plaza along the entire turnpike is located just north of the US-69 exit near McAlester. Service plazas formerly existed near the Antlers and OK-9 exits before the one near McAlester opened.

History
The route is one continuous four-lane limited access highway, but consists of two separately constructed sections. The  northern section, which opened in 1966, is the portion between I-40/US 62/US 75 near Henryetta and US 69 south of McAlester. The southern extension opened in 1970, and is the  segment from the US 69 junction to US 70/271 in Hugo.

On December 2, 2014, the Oklahoma Turnpike Authority approved funds to reconstruct the Eufaula interchange, demolishing the Eufaula service plaza and relocating the toll plaza to where the service plaza once stood. The interchange previously had the highest accident rate of all Oklahoma's turnpikes. The funds also went towards demolishing the Antlers service plaza. A new service plaza opened north of the McAlester interchange on December 19, 2014, containing a McDonald's.

The Indian Nation Turnpike originally bore no numbered designation. On August 2, 2021, the Oklahoma Transportation Commission unanimously approved a motion to apply the SH-375 designation to the turnpike. ODOT Director Tim Gatz stated in the Transportation Commission meeting that the numbering addition was primarily to aid in navigation using digital mapping and routing applications.

Tolls 
There are three mainline toll plazas, one just north of the OK-9/Eufaula exit, one just south of the US-69 exit near McAlester, and one within the Antlers exit. The toll plaza at the Eufaula exit has two high-speed Pikepass lanes, with one in each direction. These lanes do not have access to OK-9. To access the OK-9 exit from the southbound lanes, motorists must exit into the cash lanes and then exit the cash lanes before the mainline tollbooths.

A two-axle vehicle pays $7.75 ($6.20 with Pikepass and other compatible systems) to drive the full length of the turnpike.

Exit list

See also 
 Oklahoma Turnpike Authority
 Pikepass

References

Toll roads in Oklahoma
Transport infrastructure completed in 1966
Transportation in Choctaw County, Oklahoma
Transportation in Pushmataha County, Oklahoma
Transportation in Atoka County, Oklahoma
Transportation in Pittsburg County, Oklahoma
Transportation in McIntosh County, Oklahoma